Angelo Santo Cappello (born 27 January 2002) is a Belizean professional footballer who plays as a forward for National League club FC Halifax Town and the Belize national team.

Club career
Born in Belize, Cappello moved to the United Kingdom with his family at the age of 11. In August 2020, he signed a professional contract with Premier League club Sheffield United.

On 11 March 2022, Cappello joined National League North side Blyth Spartans on loan for the remainder of the 2021–22 season.

On 22 July 2022, Cappello signed for National League side FC Halifax Town following his release from Sheffield United.

International career
Capello is a Belizean youth international. He is also eligible to represent Honduras via his mother.

In November 2018, Cappello received maiden call-up to senior team of Belize for 2019–20 CONCACAF Nations League qualifying match against Puerto Rico. On 25 March 2021, he made his senior debut for Belize in a 2–0 loss against Haiti.

Career statistics

International

References

External links
 

2002 births
Living people
Association football forwards
Belizean footballers
Belize international footballers
Belize youth international footballers
Belizean people of Honduran descent
Sheffield United F.C. players
Blyth Spartans A.F.C. players
FC Halifax Town players
National League (English football) players
Belizean expatriate footballers
Expatriate footballers in England